The 2003 Asian Wrestling Championships were held in New Delhi, India. The event took place from 5 to 8 June 2003.

Medal table

Team ranking

Medal summary

Men's freestyle

Men's Greco-Roman

Women's freestyle

Participating nations 
160 competitors from 15 nations competed.

 (4)
 (13)
 (20)
 (14)
 (21)
 (19)
 (10)
 (10)
 (1)
 (2)
 (17)
 (9)
 (2)
 (11)
 (7)

References

External links
UWW Database
FILA 2003 Results Book

Asia
W
Asian Wrestling Championships
International wrestling competitions hosted by India